The sixth season of the television series Dallas aired on CBS during the 1982–83 TV season.

Cast

Starring
In alphabetical order:
 Barbara Bel Geddes as Miss Ellie Ewing (28 episodes)
 Patrick Duffy as Bobby Ewing (28 episodes)
 Linda Gray as Sue Ellen Ewing (28 episodes)
 Larry Hagman as J.R. Ewing (28 episodes)
 Susan Howard as Donna Culver Krebbs (28 episodes)
 Steve Kanaly as Ray Krebbs (28 episodes)
 Ken Kercheval as Cliff Barnes (28 episodes)
 Victoria Principal as Pamela Barnes Ewing (28 episodes)
 Charlene Tilton as Lucy Ewing Cooper (26 episodes)

Also Starring
 Audrey Landers as Afton Cooper (26 episodes)
 Howard Keel as Clayton Farlow (24 episodes)
 Priscilla Pointer as Rebecca Barnes Wentworth (18 episodes)
 John Beck as Mark Graison (13 episodes)
 Jared Martin as Steven "Dusty" Farlow (1 episode)

Special Guest Stars
 Dale Robertson as Frank Crutcher (5 episodes)
 E. J. André as Eugene Bullock (3 episodes)
 Nicholas Hammond as Bill Johnson (3 episodes)
 Donald Moffat as Brooks Oliver (3 episodes)
 Barry Corbin as Sheriff Fenton Washburn (2 episodes)
 Henry Darrow as Garcia (2 episodes)

Notable guest stars
Morgan Brittany (Katherine Wentworth) and Morgan Woodward (Punk Anderson) continue to appear, and among the actors to debut during the season are Lois Chiles (Holly Harwood), Timothy Patrick Murphy (Mickey Trotter), Roseanna Christiansen (Teresa), Danone Simpson (Kendall Chapman), Alice Hirson (Mavis Anderson), Kenneth Kimmins (Thornton McLeish), Kate Reid (Lil Trotter), Eric Farlow (Christopher Ewing), and Mary Armstrong (nanny Louise). 

John Anderson appears in two episodes as Richard McIntyre - he will return as a "special guest star" during season 11, playing Dr. Herbert Styles. Additionally, Ben Piazza (Walt Discoll) appears in a major story-arc, but won't return for future seasons, and Knots Landing'''s Ted Shackelford (Gary Ewing) appears in one episode.

John Larroquette also appears in two episodes as Lucy Ewing's divorce attorney Phillip Colton.

 Crew 
The season's episode writers include showrunner Leonard Katzman, the returning Arthur Bernard Lewis, David Paulsen, Howard Lakin, Will Lorin, Linda B. Elstad, and new additions Frank Furino and Robert Sherman.

Philip Capice serves as executive producer, Katzman as producer, Cliff Fenneman as associate producer, and writer Arthur Bernard Lewis as supervising producer. Writer David Paulsen, who joined the series for season four, takes on the duty of the show's story editor.

DVD release
Season six was released by Warner Bros. Home Video, on a Region 1 DVD box set of five double-sided DVDs, on January 30, 2007. In addition to the 28 episodes, it also includes the featurette "Power and Influence: The Dallas Legacy".

 Knots Landing 

After a one year-absence, the Dallas cast returned to appear in spinoff series Knots Landing, now on its fourth year: first J.R. (Larry Hagman) appeared alone in Daniel (airing October 7, 1982), and then he returned alongside Bobby (Patrick Duffy) and baby Christopher (Eric Farlow) in New Beginnings (October 29, 1982) - the last time any Dallas character appeared in Knots Landing''.

Episodes

References

General references

External links 

1982 American television seasons
1983 American television seasons
Dallas (1978 TV series) seasons